Mary Rasmussen is a British Labour Party politician who has served as the Lord Mayor of Liverpool since May 2021 and as a Liverpool City Councillor for Speke-Garston ward since May 2007.

Early life and education
Rasmussen was born in Garston, Liverpool to Irish parents - Thomas and Theresa Gibbons - as the third of ten children. She attended St. Francis of Assisi Primary School and later Blessed John Almond School. She completed a university course before opting to work with people who were long-term unemployed.

Career
For a period, Rasmussen worked with long-term unemployed people. She has worked as a Partnership Manager for Reed, a UK-based employment agency, since August 2014. She is a board member of several groups, including South Liverpool Homes, Speke Community Pensioners Group and Speke Adventure Playground.

Liverpool City Council
Rasmussen was elected as a Liverpool City Councillor in May 2007, succeeding Councillor Doreen Knight of the Labour Party. She defeated Paula Keaveney of the Liberal Democrats and received 57.1% of the vote. She has since been re-elected three times, most recently in 2019 with 79.8% of the vote.

She has served as Chair of Liverpool City Council's Labour Group and as the group's Chief Whip, the first woman to hold the position.

Rasmussen was sworn in as Lord Mayor of Liverpool on 28 May 2021 at Liverpool Tennis Centre owing to COVID-19 social distancing requirements. She chose her son, Michael, to serve as Consort and her daughter, Janine, to serve as Lady Mayoress. As Lord Mayor, she opted to sponsor The Whitechapel Centre, Tom Harrison House and Speke Training and Education Centre.

Personal life
Rasmussen has two children: Michael, a maths teacher, and Janine. Her daughter Lian passed away in 2020.

References

Living people
Labour Party (UK) councillors
People from Garston
British people of Irish descent
Mayors of Liverpool
Year of birth missing (living people)
Women councillors in England
Women mayors of places in England